ʿAin Mallaha or Eynan was an Epipalaeolithic settlement belonging to the Natufian culture, built and settled circa 10,000–8,000 BCE. The settlement is an example of hunter-gatherer sedentism, a crucial step in the transition from foraging to farming.

ʿAin Mallaha has one of the earliest known archaeological evidence of dog domestication.

The village
At the time of its Natufian inhabitance, the area was heavily forested in oak, almond, and pistachio trees.

Evidence of settlement at Mallaha or ʿAin Mallaha dates back to the Mesolithic period at circa 10,000 BCE. The first permanent village settlement of pre-agricultural times in Israel, Kathleen Kenyon describes the material remains found there as Natufian. The Natufian village was colonized in three phases. The first two phases had massive stone-built structures with smaller ones in the third phase. These phases occurred from 12,000 to 9600 BCE. The dwellings were cut into the earth, had subterranean floors, and walls that were built of dry stone. Wooden posts supported the roofs, which were probably thatches with brushwood or animal hides. Hearths were located within the dwellings. The floors and walls of the homes were decorated in solid white or red, a simple and popular decorative motif in the Near East at the time.

Diet 

The inhabitants of ʿAin Mallaha were sedentary hunter gatherers; it is likely that they lived in ʿAin Mallaha year round, gathering food from the surrounding wild stands of edible vegetation, and hunting local game. The inhabitants used hand mortars for grinding wild nuts and grain, and stone sickles for cutting plants from wild stands. Many of these sickle stones hold "sickle-gloss," indicating they had been used to cut large numbers of plant stems, most likely wild wheat and barley. The inhabitants are known to have eaten gazelle, fallow deer, wild boar, red and roe deer, hare, tortoise, reptiles, and fish.

The inhabitants appear to have subsisted on fish from nearby Lake Hula, as well as by hunting and gathering; no evidence of animal domestication or cultivation has been found, with the conspicuous exception of dogs (see Burial customs).

Burial customs 
It is likely that entire families were buried in the remains of their own houses, the houses being subsequently abandoned. During excavation, Perrot found one dwelling to contain the graves of 11 men, women, and children, many of them wearing elaborate decorations made from dentalium shells. In another dwelling (131), twelve individuals were found, one buried with her hand resting on the body of a small puppy. This burial of a human being with a domestic dog represents the earliest known archaeological evidence of dog domestication. One of the female burials has disarranged body parts and gazelle horn-cores placed near the head, David Wengrow has used this as evidence for the deep-history animal-human composites.

Excavation 
ʿAin Mallaha was discovered in 1954 and salvage excavations were carried out under the supervision of J. Perrot, M. Lechevalier and Francois Valla of the CNRS.

See also

 Mallaha
 Archaeology of Israel

References

External links
 ʿAin Mallaha at mnsu.edu

Archaeological sites in Israel
Former populated places in Southwest Asia
Natufian sites
Prehistoric sites in Israel
Hula Valley
Populated places established in the 10th millennium BC